Ololygon melloi is a species of frog in the family Hylidae.

It is endemic to Brazil.
Its natural habitat is subtropical or tropical moist montane forests.

References

melloi
Endemic fauna of Brazil
Frogs of South America
Amphibians described in 1989
Taxonomy articles created by Polbot